John Momose Cheyo is a Tanzanian UDP politician and Member of Parliament for Bariadi East constituency since 2005.

References

Living people
Tanzanian MPs 2005–2010
Tanzanian MPs 2010–2015
United Democratic Party (Tanzania) politicians
Year of birth missing (living people)